Addicted To Love is a Singaporean and Malaysian co-production Chinese drama which was telecast on Malaysia's free-to-air channel, ntv7. It made its debut on 22 October 2008 and ended its run on 10 December 2008. The drama consists of a total of 30 episodes. It was screened on every weekday night, 10:00 pm. This was the second Malaysian series to be screened on Channel U after  The Thin Line.

External links
 Phyllis Quek's perfect role - STAR

Chinese-language drama television series in Malaysia
Singapore Chinese dramas
Singapore–Malaysia television co-productions
2008 Malaysian television series debuts
2008 Singaporean television series debuts
2008 Malaysian television series endings
2008 Singaporean television series endings
NTV7 original programming
Channel U (Singapore) original programming